Mahmoud al-Abrash or Mahmoud el-Abrache (born 1944) is a Syrian politician.

Career
He was originally an engineer in public works. He then left his job to engage in politics and became a member of the Baath party. He chaired the parliamentary Committee on International Affairs of the Arab people.

On October 7, 2003 he became Syrian speaker of parliament following the appointment of Muhammad Naji al-Otari as prime minister. His first term ended on March 8, 2007 but he was re-elected again on May 7, 2007.

He is also a member of the Provisional Arab Parliament.

References

Speakers of the People's Assembly of Syria
1944 births
Living people
Arab Socialist Ba'ath Party – Syria Region politicians
Politicians from Damascus
Syrian Sunni Muslims
Syrian engineers